Pope-Waverley was one of the marques of the Pope Motor Car Company founded by Albert Augustus Pope and was a manufacturer of Brass Era electric automobiles in Indianapolis, Indiana. From 1908 until production ceased in 1914 they became independent again as the Waverley Company.

History
The company was originally formed as the Indiana Bicycle Company in 1898 changing to the American Bicycle Company in 1900. In 1901 it became the International Motor Car Company before joining the Pope group as the Waverley Department of Pope Motor Car Company in 1904. Originally a small runabout, the Waverley grew to include 4 seats by 1902. When the Pope empire was foundering in 1908, Indianapolis businessmen rescued the Pope-Waverley and established a new Waverley Company to continue production. From 1912, the Waverley had a hood to resemble a gasoline car. This was called the Sheltered Roaster but it later became the Model 90. Front Drive and Rear Drive model designations were used based on the drivers seating position.  Waverley Company ceased production in 1916.

Pope-Waverley Models 
The 1904 Pope-Waverley Chelsea was a runabout model. It could seat 2 passengers and sold for US$1100. The single electric motor was situated at the rear of the car, and produced . The car used 30 batteries.

The 1904 Pope-Waverley Road Wagon was a smaller wagon model. It could seat 2 passengers with an open box at the rear for cargo and sold for US$850. The single electric motor was situated at the rear of the car and produced .

The 1904 Pope-Waverley Edison Battery Wagon was a runabout model with 48-cell Edison batteries. It could seat 2 passengers and sold for US$2250. The electric motor was situated at the rear of the car.

The 1904 Pope-Waverley Tonneau was a tonneau model. It could seat 5 passengers and sold for US$1800. Twin electric motors were situated at the rear of the car, producing  each with a special  overload mode. The armored wood-framed car used 40 batteries and could reach .

Gallery

See also
Photo of ca. 1900 Waverly driven by Swan Turnblad at the Minnesota Historical Society.
Frank Leslie's Popular Monthly (January, 1904)
Pope-Waverly at ConceptCarz

References 

Electric vehicles introduced in the 20th century
Defunct motor vehicle manufacturers of the United States
Motor vehicle manufacturers based in Indiana
Defunct companies based in Indiana
Electric vehicle manufacturers of the United States
Electric vehicles
Veteran vehicles
Brass Era vehicles
1890s cars
1900s cars
1910s cars
Cars introduced in 1898
Vehicle manufacturing companies established in 1898
Vehicle manufacturing companies disestablished in 1914